Chrysilla volupe is a species of spider of the family Salticidae. It is found in Sri Lanka, India, Nepal, and Bhutan.

Description
Males have a carapace in reddish orange color with two iridescent blue stripes. Legs have iridescent scales that make them appear golden and purple shades. Females have greyish carapace with grey eyebrows with all legs yellow in color. The female was described 139 years after the species was first described by Karsch in 1879. Until 2018, only males had been identified and described, based on the male type specimen described by Karsch.

References

Salticidae
Spiders of Asia
Spiders of the Indian subcontinent
Spiders described in 1879
Taxa named by Ferdinand Karsch